Southeast Colorado Hospital is a regional hospital in Springfield, Colorado, in Baca County. Established in 1966 and first opened in 1969, the hospital has 23 beds. The hospital is a district hospital, which in Colorado means that it is part of a special district, a type of local government. The hospital brands itself as Southeast Colorado Hospital District.

The hospital is a Level IV trauma center. The hospital also operates a 40-bed long-term care center, a home health agency and hospice, a 16-bed Alzheimer's care unit, and an outpatient medical clinic.

References

External links
Hospital website
 

Hospitals in Colorado
Buildings and structures in Baca County, Colorado
Hospitals established in 1966
1966 establishments in Colorado